Adbee Markaz Kamraz (AMK), sometimes referred to as Adbee Markaz Kamraz Jammu and Kashmir (AMKJK), is an oldest and the largest cultural and literary organisation of the Jammu Jammu and Kashmir union territory focused on promoting and preserving Kashmiri culture, literature, art and Kashmiri language in particular. Sponsored by the government of Jammu and Kashmir, it is headquartered in  Baramullah district of the Kashmir Valley. It consisting a group with centralized control of 22 to 24 registered literary and cultural organizations of the valley, responsible for literary activities such as promote research, organise meetings and publish books that originally belongs to Kashmiri writers.

In 2012, it organised Kashmir Literature Festival, a first-ever writers' festival in the history of Jammu and Kashmir focused on internationalize the Kashmiri language and  addressing the issues responsible for its decline in the region. The festival is based on the Jaipur Literature Festival and Karachi Literature Festival to showcase the writers' work on international-level. In 2012, it established one of its branch offices for literary activities in Delhi aimed at to highlight and promote Kashmiri language for Kashmiri speaking people in the National Capital Region (NCR).

Base units 
In 2015, the organisation proposed to establish its base units outside India and suggested to establish headquarters in London and New York aimed at promoting and safeguarding Kashmiri language outside the country.

Activities 
It has also been engaged with the state government for introducing regional languages in curriculum recognised by the Jammu and Kashmir State Board of School Education.

Journals 
It publishes biannual academic journal called Praave (also spelled Prav or Prave) which highlights the work of the organization and the people associated with literary activities.

Composition

Awards established 
It has established various literary awards such as Sharaf-e-Kamraz, Shehjar-e-Adab Lolab and Khilat-e-Hanfi Sopori, and while they are presented under the different categories, Sharaf-e-Kamraz according to the organization is one of the highest awards in the region. Awards are decided and presented annually by the AMK jury upon writers and educationists in recognition of their contribution to the Kashmiri language and literature.

References 
Amin Bhat elected president Adbee Markaz Kamraz President

External links 

Culture of Jammu and Kashmir
Organisations based in Jammu and Kashmir
Cultural organisations based in India
State agencies of Jammu and Kashmir
Indian writers' organisations
Poetry organizations
Organizations with year of establishment missing